The Battle of Minorca (20 May 1756) was a  naval battle between French and British fleets. It was the opening sea battle of the Seven Years' War in the European theatre. Shortly after the war began British and French squadrons met off the Mediterranean island of Minorca. The French won the battle. The subsequent decision by the British to withdraw to Gibraltar handed France a strategic victory and led directly to the Fall of Minorca.

The British failure to save Minorca led to the controversial court-martial and execution of the British commander, Admiral John Byng, for "failure to do his utmost" to relieve the siege of the British garrison on Minorca.

Background

The French had been menacing the British-held garrison on Minorca, which had come under British control during the War of the Spanish Succession in 1708. Great Britain and France had commenced hostilities in the New World colonies earlier in 1754 (the French and Indian War), and at this point the conflict was not going well for Great Britain.  The government was anxious to protect her presence closer to home, and was concerned that the French might even be planning to invade Great Britain itself (as France had attempted in previous wars by supporting the Stuart claimants to the throne during the Jacobite Wars).

The long-expected French move on Minorca finally caused the British government to act, albeit belatedly, and a squadron of 10 ships of the line was dispatched from Gibraltar to its defence, under the command of John Byng (then a Vice-Admiral, but quickly promoted to Admiral for the purpose). Despite having considerable intelligence of the strength of the French fleet at Toulon that was designated for the invasion of Minorca, the ships allocated to Byng were all in a poor state of repair and undermanned.

Prelude
When Byng and his fleet, now numbering 13 ships of the line (having been reinforced by ships of the Minorca squadron that had escaped the island), arrived off Minorca on 19 May, they found the island already overrun by French troops, with only the garrison of St. Philip's Castle in Port Mahon holding out. Byng's orders were to relieve the garrison, but a French squadron of 12 ships of the line and 5 frigates intervened as the afternoon wore on. The two fleets positioned themselves, and battle was drawn up on the morning of the following day.

Battle

Facing 12 French ships of the line, Byng formed his 12 largest ships into a single line of battle and approached the head of the French line on a parallel course while maintaining the weather gage. He then ordered his ships to go about and come alongside their opposite numbers in the French fleet. However, the poor signalling capability of the times caused confusion and delay in closing. The British van took a considerable pounding from their more heavily armed French adversaries, while the rear of the line, including Byng's flagship, failed to come within effective cannon range. During the battle Byng displayed considerable caution and an over-reliance on standard fighting procedures, and several of his ships were seriously damaged, while no ships were lost by the French. Following a Council of War, at which all the senior officers present concurred, it was agreed the fleet stood no chance of further damaging the French ships or of relieving the garrison. Byng therefore gave orders to return to Gibraltar.

Aftermath
The battle could hardly be considered anything other than a French victory in the light of Byng failing to press on to relieve the garrison or pursue the French fleet which inaction resulted in severe criticism. The Admiralty, perhaps concerned to divert attention from its own lack of preparation for the disastrous venture, charged him for breaching the Articles of War by failing to do all he could to fulfill his orders and support the garrison; he was court-martialled, found guilty and sentenced to death, and – despite pleas for clemency – executed on 14 March 1757 aboard  in Portsmouth harbour.

Byng's execution is referred to in Voltaire's novel Candide with the line Dans ce pays-ci, il est bon de tuer de temps en temps un amiral pour encourager les autres – "In this country, it is thought wise to kill an admiral from time to time to encourage the others."

Despite William Pitt's eagerness to regain the island, a British expedition was not sent to recapture it for the remainder of the war. It was eventually returned to Britain following the Treaty of Paris, in exchange for the French West Indies and Belle-Île.

Order of battle
In order of their place in the line of battle:

British fleet

Attached frigates

French fleet

Attached frigates

See also
  
 Arthur Phillip, an otherwise notable midshipman

References

Bibliography
 Anderson, Fred. Crucible of War: The Seven Years' War and the fate of Empire in British North America, 1754-1766. Faber and Faber, 2000.
 Brown, Peter Douglas. William Pitt, Earl of Chatham: The Great Commoner. George Allen & Unwin, 1978.
 Dull, Jonathan R. The French Navy and the Seven Years' War. University of Nebraska, 2005.
 
 Lambert, Andrew. Admirals: The Naval Commanders Who Made Britain Great. Faber and Faber, 2009.
 McGuffie, T. H. "The Defence of Minorca 1756" History Today (1951) 1#10 pp 49-55. online

Naval battles of the Seven Years' War
Battle of Menorca
Naval battles involving Great Britain
Naval battles involving France
Naval battles involving Spain
Menorca, battle of
Battle 1756